George Joachim Goschen, 2nd Viscount Goschen,  (15 October 1866 – 24 July 1952), was a British Conservative politician who served as Member of Parliament for East Grinstead from 1895 to 1906 and as Governor of Madras from 1924 to 1929. In 1929, he was appointed Viceroy of India and held the position de facto in the former's absence.

George Joachim Goschen, 2nd Viscount, was the son of prominent Conservative (formerly Liberal and Liberal Unionist) politician and Chancellor of the Exchequer, George Goschen, 1st Viscount Goschen. He had his early education in the United Kingdom and served as Secretary to Victor Child Villiers, 7th Earl of Jersey, the Governor of New South Wales in Australia from 1890 to 1892. In 1895 and 1900, he was elected to the House of Commons from East Grinstead and served as a Member of Parliament from 1895 to 1906 and as the Parliamentary Secretary to the Board of Agriculture and Fisheries from March to June 1918. In 1924 he was appointed Governor of Madras, India, and served from 1924 to 1929, and acted as the Viceroy of India from 1929 to 1931. He died in 1952 at the age of 85.

Goschen was knighted the grace of Order of Saint John in 1921 and made a GCSI in March 1924. He was also a member of the Privy Council of the United Kingdom.

Early life and family 

George Joachim Goschen was born to George Goschen, 1st Viscount Goschen, and his wife Lucy née Dalley on 15 October 1866 at Hastings. His ancestors had moved to the United Kingdom from Germany. He was education at Rugby School, and Balliol College, Oxford.

Goschen fell in love with Lady Margaret Evelyn Gathorne-Hardy, the youngest of five daughters of the Earl of Cranbrook, who was eight years older than he was, but still desired to marry her. His father, the 1st Viscount, was, however, strongly opposed to their marriage and used his influence to get an appointment for his son as a Private Secretary to Lord Jersey, the Governor of New South Wales in Australia. Goschen calmly obeyed his father's orders and worked in Australia from 1890 to 1892. On his return from Australia, however, he married Margaret in 1893.

He was a Major in the 2nd Volunteer Battalion of The Buffs (East Kent Regiment), and from February 1901 served as an extra Aide de camp to Lord Roberts, Commander-in-Chief during the Second Boer War.

Member of Parliament for East Grinstead 
Goschen entered politics early in life. In 1895, he was elected to the House of Commons of the United Kingdom as a Conservative for the then East Grinstead constituency in Sussex and served as a member of parliament for two terms from 18 July 1895 to 25 January 1906. In July 1913, he was elected Chairman of the Council of the Corporation of Foreign Bondholders which comprised some of the leading financiers in England. Goschen served as the Parliamentary Secretary to the Board of Agriculture and Fisheries from March to June 1918.

Goschen succeeded his father as Viscount Goschen on the latter's death on 7 February 1907. In December 1910, he was appointed a deputy lieutenant of Kent.

Governor of Madras 

Goschen was appointed Governor of Madras in 1924 and he arrived at Madras in May 1924 to take charge. Goschen was awarded the GCSI in March 1924.

The Madras Presidency Radio Club started a radio transmission service in Madras, the first in the city, in 1924, under Goschen's patronage. This service lasted from 1924 to 1927. Goschen was also involved in the early stages of the Loyola College, Chennai, and presided over its first college day in 1928. The Children's Hospital at Mangalore was refurbished and renamed as Lady Goschen Hospital while the SPG College, Trichinopoly, was renamed as Bishop Heber College and Goschen presided over its diamond jubilee celebrations in 1926.

In November 1926, the Pykara hydroelectric project across the Moyar river was conceived by Lord Goschen.

Goschen maintained friendly relations with the Raja of Panagal who was the Chief Minister of Madras Presidency. However, in the 1926 elections to the Madras Legislative Assembly, the Justice Party, to which the Raja belonged, was reduced to a minority winning only 21 out of 98 seats in the assembly. The Raja stepped down as Chief Minister and handed over his resignation to the Governor. Goschen invited S. Srinivasa Iyengar, the leader of the Swarajya Party which had won a majority, to form the government, but he refused as the acceptance of public posts would defeat the very purpose of the Swarajists to disrupt the working of the dyarchy. Goschen, therefore, made an independent, P. Subbarayan, the Chief Minister, and nominated 34 members to the council to support him. As the government was set up by Goschen and all the members nominated by him, it functioned more or less like a puppet government.

Subbarayan's government was the subject of much controversy and survived a no-confidence motion on 23 August 1927. Its position became more precarious when the Simon Commission arrived in India in 1928. The Swarajya Party moved a resolution exhorting a boycott of the commission and the Justice Party supported them. The motion was passed 65 to 50 with both of Subbarayan's ministers in favour of a boycott. Subbarayan responded by resigning his post. Goschen, however, mediated a settlement with the Raja of Panagal and appointed a Justice Party nominee, Krishnan Nair to the Executive Council. The Justice Party, immediately, withdrew their support to the resolution and welcomed the commission. Just before his retirement from active politics in 1925, the Justice Party insisted upon a gift of land to their leader Theagaroya Chetty from the Madras government but Goschen staunchly refused to make the grant.
A block named "Goschen Block" was constructed in the Govt Estate (presently Omandurar Estate) in Mount Road. This had a number of houses allotted to Govt officials and later to MLAs (Mr P. Kakkan, Minister in the Kamaraj Govt, lived in one). Goschen Block was demolished when construction of the new Assembly building (now a hospital) started.

During his tenure, the Yanam-Neelapalli bridge was constructed. Yanam was then a French colony. He laid the foundation stone for the bridge on 10 December 1927.

Viceroy of India 

Lord Irwin, the Viceroy of India, left for London on leave from July 1929. He appointed Goschen to act as the Viceroy during his absence, which lasted for the remainder of Irwin's tenure until April, 1931. As such, Goschen was de facto Viceroy of India and inaugurated. George Goschen's father, the 1st Viscount, had been offered the Viceroyalty of India by British Prime Minister William Ewart Gladstone in 1880, but had declined the offer.

Later life 

In 1933, a group which called itself the Union of Britain and India was formed in London. This group was in favour of an Indian federation. Goschen served as the first President of the union. Goschen also wrote a chapter titled "Provincial Autonomy" in the 1934 book India from a Back Bench where he criticized the dyarchy system regarding it as a failure based on his experience as an administrator in India.

Personal life 

On 26 January 1893, at Benenden, Kent, Goschen married Lady Margaret Evelyn-Gathorne Hardy (d. 11 July 1943), daughter of Gathorne Gathorne-Hardy, 1st Earl of Cranbrook by his wife Jane (née Stewart-Orr). Lady Goschen gave her name to the Viscountess Goschen Government Girls (Muslim) High School in Tharanallur, Tiruchirappalli, Tamil Nadu.

They had three children:

Lt. Hon. George Joachim, 7th Btn E Kent Regiment (18 November 1893 – 16 January 1916) died of wounds received in action at the Siege of Kut
Hon. Phyllis Evelyn, Lady-in-Waiting to Her Royal Highness the Princess Royal 1948–1965 (5 August 1895 – 27 May 1976), married Lt Col. Francis Cecil Campbell Balfour
Hon. Cicely Winifred (29 April 1899 – 1980), married Maj. Melville Edward Bertram Portal, son of Sir Bertram Percy Portal

Goschen died on 25 July 1952 at the age of 85. His title passed to his nephew John Goschen.

References

Sources

Further reading

External links

Goschen, George Goschen, 2nd Viscount
Goschen, George Goschen, 2nd Viscount
Governors of Madras
Conservative Party (UK) MPs for English constituencies
Goschen, George Goschen, 2nd Viscount
Goschen, George Goschen, 2nd Viscount
Goschen, George Goschen, 2nd Viscount
Goschen, George Goschen, 2nd Viscount
UK MPs 1895–1900
UK MPs 1900–1906
UK MPs who inherited peerages
English people of German descent
Buffs (Royal East Kent Regiment) officers
Deputy Lieutenants of Kent
Military personnel from Kent
George Goschen, 2nd Viscount Goschen
George 2